Witica is a genus of orb-weaver spiders first described by Octavius Pickard-Cambridge in 1895.  it contains only three species.

References

Araneidae
Araneomorphae genera